The sexual abuse scandal in Austria is a major chapter in the series of Catholic sex abuse cases in various Western jurisdictions.

Cardinal Groër
Cardinal Hans Hermann Groër was removed as Archbishop of Vienna by John Paul II for alleged sexual misconduct. Officially, the Pope accepted the resignation letter which Groër had written on the occasion of his 75th birthday. This made Groër, who adamantly refused until his death to comment in public on the allegations, one of the highest-ranking Catholic clergymen to be involved in the sexual abuse scandals.

Upon request of the Holy See, Groër spent several months in Dresden and later retired to St. Joseph's Priory. Groër died in Sankt Pölten at age 83, and is buried in a Cistercian cemetery in Marienfeld, Austria.

Seminary of Sankt Pölten
Bishop Kurt Krenn resigned from his post (see of Sankt Pölten, a suffragan of Vienna) in 2004 after there was a scandal concerning child pornography allegedly being downloaded by a student at the seminary.  Up to 40,000 photos and an undisclosed number of films, including child pornography, were found on the computer of one of the seminarians, but Krenn earlier angered many by calling the images a "childish prank".

John Paul II ordered an investigation into the allegations, and Krenn voluntarily resigned from the post.

Public reaction
In 2004, Church leaders declared that a number of Austrian laypeople had left the Catholic Church as a consequence of the scandal.

See also

Charter for the Protection of Children and Young People
Child sexual abuse
Essential Norms
National Review Board
Pontifical Commission for the Protection of Minors
Religious abuse
Sexual abuse
Sexual misconduct

References

External links
Child And Youth Protection; US Conference of Catholic Bishops

Austria
Austria
Scandals in Austria
sex abuse
Violence in Austria
Religious controversies in Austria